The following are the winners of the 13th annual (1986) Origins Award, presented at Origins 1987:

Charles Roberts Awards

The H.G. Wells Awards

External links
 1986 Origins Awards Winners

1986 awards
1986 awards in the United States
Origins Award winners